Paul Thiene (1880–1971) was a German-born American landscape architect.

Biography

Early life
He was born in Germany in 1880 and emigrated to the United States in 1903.

Career
He worked with landscape architect Frederick Law Olmsted, Jr. (1870-1957) until 1910. Later, he worked on the Panama–California Exposition in San Diego, California with Lloyd Wright, and they collaborated until 1918. Later, he designed landscapes for homes in Southern California, including Santa Barbara, Pasadena, and Beverly Hills. Additionally, he created an 80-foot waterfall on the grounds of the Greystone Mansion in Beverly Hills.

He was a fellow of the American Society of Landscape Architects. He retired in 1951, at the age of seventy-one.

Personal life
He resided in Pasadena. He died in 1971.

References

1880 births
1971 deaths
German emigrants to the United States
Architects from Pasadena, California
American landscape architects